Recycle BC (previously known as Multi-Material B.C.) is a not-for-profit organization which manages residential packaging and paper recycling in British Columbia. The not-for-profit was created in 2014, after a 2011 law by the British Columbia Ministry of Environment, transferring the cost of recycling from residents to producers. Producers who sell products in British Columbia pay fees to Recycle BC for the packaging and paper supplied on a quarterly basis determined by how many kilograms of each material they sold in the province. Items collected are sorted and sold to end-markets for processing into new products.

Curbside recycling 
Recycle BC manages recycling collected from 156 communities which include 1.8 million households (98% of British Columbia's population). In 13 of these communities, Recycle BC also manages the collection of materials directly from households. The remaining communities receive curbside and multi-family recycling collection paid for by Recycle BC. Items accepted by the program can differ depending on the community, but typically include paper, cardboard, plastic containers, metal containers, cartons, paper cups. Some areas also have separate bins for the collection of glass bottles and jars; however, they are only accepted at depots in most areas. Collected plastics are processed within the province through a contract with Green by Nature.

The three major newspaper companies in British Columbia (Postmedia Network, Black Press and Glacier Media) have refused to pay their fees, resulting in the provincial government sending the publishers warning notices in 2016. In 2017, News Media Canada created their own stewardship plan, which uses operational elements of the Recycle BC system to recycle newsprint.

A pilot project was conducted in Coquitlam from May – August 2018 to recycle squeeze tubes, making it the first city in North America to accept the item through curbside recycling.

Collection done by Recycle BC 
 Anmore
 Coquitlam
 Langley (city)
 Prince George
 Quesnel
 Regional District of North Okanagan
 Regional District of Kootenay Boundary (Kootenay Region)
 Revelstoke
 University Endowment Lands
 Pitt Meadows
 Regional District of Central Kootenay (areas H, I, J)
 Vancouver
 Regional District of Kootenay Boundary (Boundary Region)

Recycling depots 
Recycle BC has contracts with private companies which operate recycling depots and are paid by the kilogram per material type. Most of these recycling depots also act as Return-It depots to collect bottles and cans with deposits. Most depots accept curbside recycling items; however, some only collect polystyrene foam, plastic bags and glass (in some communities). In June 2018, a pilot program began at 116 depots in the province to collect flexible plastics. Items accepted in this new program include cellophane, zipper storage bags, bubble wrap, chip bags. granola bar wrappers, net bags for produce, plastic shipping envelopes and woven rice bags. London Drugs stores in the province also act as Reycle BC depots.

Streetside recycling 
In August 2016, Recycle BC began a pilot program with the City of Vancouver consisting of 31 sets of bins, including for paper and mixed containers. They are located in the West End and the pilot program ran until the end of 2017. As of July 2018, the bins were still in place.

Multiple cities have criticized Recycle BC for still not fulfilling its obligation to operate streetside recycling programs, as of October 2018, even though they have been obliged to do so since 2014. The organization claims that the streetside bins are too contaminated for the material to be recycled.

Criticism 
Some residents in small BC communities have criticized Recycle BC for not collecting materials there, as it costs more than in larger centres. Some communities have also seen items which were previously taken in curbside bins (ie. plastic bags) now having to be brought to a recycling depot. Books are also excluded from recycling in British Columbia, as the province decided not to make publishers pay for their recycling. The town of Osoyoos has also complained to Recycle BC regarding their plan to eliminate blue plastic bags as a method for curbside collection. During a comment period in October 2018, Recycle BC proposed expanding their program to include packaging-like products, which was supported by local governments and depots. However, they caved to the pressure by product manufactures and backed down from the proposal.

References 

Recycling in Canada
2014 establishments in British Columbia
Non-profit organizations based in British Columbia
Companies based in Vancouver